The Kopothakho River (Sanskrit), or Kobodak, Kabadak, or Kapotaksha, is a river of Bangladesh. Kopothakho is famous for upholding the memory of popular Bengali poet Michael Madhusudan Dutt.

Origin 
Though originated from the Mathabhanga river, Kopothakho got disconnected from its source. Now It is mainly a branch of Bhairab river. The river flows through different areas of Jessore, Satkhira, Khulna districts and finally meets the Kholpetua river in Khulna District. The lower part of the river is tidal.

Current situation 
The river is shrinking everyday due to the actions of encroachers. Different organizations have come forward and urged the authorities to take initiatives to save the river.

Kapotaksha River in literature 
Kopothakho first appeared in the famous poem "Kopotakkho Nod" of Michael Madhusudan Dutt. It was one of the first sonnets of Bengali literature introduced by Dutt. Afterwards many other works been created on it.

References

Rivers of Bangladesh
Rivers of Khulna Division